The Baptist Union of Wales (Undeb Bedyddwyr Cymru) is a fellowship of Baptist churches in Wales. It is affiliated with the Baptist World Alliance. The headquarters is in Carmarthen.

History
The General Baptist minister Hugh Evans was one of the first Baptists to preach in Wales around 1646, in the parishes of Llan-hir, Cefnllys, Nantmel, and Llanddewi Ystradenny, as well as in districts across the upper Wye Valley in Breconshire. In 1649 John Myles (1621–1683) and Thomas Proud led in the formation of a congregation at Ilston, before Myles emigrated to Swansea, Massachusetts, in 1663. Myles and Proud were connected to the Particular Baptists in London. In 1650 three Baptist congregations held the first general meeting of Baptists in Wales. The national union was organized in 1866.

Membership
According to a denomination census released in 2020, it claimed 334 churches and 9,052 members. 

The Baptist Union of Wales is a member of the Free Church Council, Cytûn (Churches Together in Wales), the European Baptist Federation, and the Baptist World Alliance.

See also
Nonconformism
Religion in Wales

References

External links
Undeb Bedyddwyr Cymru/Baptist Union of Wales - official Web Site
Shropshire Baptist History Introduction

1866 establishments in Wales
Baptist Christianity in Wales
Baptist denominations in the United Kingdom
Religious organizations established in 1866